In the mathematical field of graph theory, the pancake graph Pn or n-pancake graph is a graph whose vertices are the permutations of n symbols from 1 to n and its edges are given between permutations transitive by prefix reversals.

Pancake sorting is the colloquial term for the mathematical problem of sorting a disordered stack of pancakes in order of size when a spatula can be inserted at any point in the stack and used to flip all pancakes above it.  A pancake number is the minimum number of flips required for a given number of pancakes. Obtaining the pancake number is equivalent to the problem of obtaining the diameter of the pancake graph.

The pancake graph of dimension n, Pn, is a regular graph with  vertices. Its degree is n − 1, hence, according to the handshaking lemma, it has  edges. Pn can be constructed recursively from n copies of Pn−1, by assigning a different element from the set {1, 2, …, n} as a suffix to each copy.

Results
Pn (n ≥ 4) is super-connected and hyper-connected.

Their girth is

 

The γ(Pn) genus of Pn is:

Chromatic properties
There are some known graph coloring properties of pancake graphs.

A Pn (n ≥ 3) pancake graph has total chromatic number , chromatic index .

There are effective algorithms for the proper (n−1)-coloring and total n-coloring of pancake graphs.

For the  chromatic number the following limits are known:

If , then

if , then

if , then
 

The following table discusses specific chromatic number values for some small n.

Cycle enumeration
In a Pn (n ≥ 3) pancake graph there is always at least one cycle of length ℓ, when  (but there are no cycles of length 3, 4 or 5). It implies that the graph is Hamiltonian and any two vertices can be joined by a Hamiltonian path.

About the 6-cycles of the Pn (n ≥ 4) pancake graph: every vertex belongs to exactly one 6-cycle. The graph contains  independent (vertex-disjoint) 6-cycles.

About the 7-cycles of the Pn (n ≥ 4) pancake graph: every vertex belongs to  7-cyles. The graph contains  different 7-cycles.

About the 8-cycles of the Pn (n ≥ 4) pancake graph: the graph contains  different 8-cycles; a maximal set of independent 8-cycles contains  of those.

Diameter
The pancake sorting problem (obtaining the pancake number) and obtaining the diameter of the pancake graph are equivalents. One of the main difficulties in solving this problem is the complicated cycle structure of the pancake graph.

In 2011, Laurent Bulteau, Guillaume Fertin, and Irena Rusu proved that the problem of finding the shortest sequence of flips for a given stack of pancakes is NP-hard, thereby answering a question that had been open for over three decades.

Burnt pancake graph
In a variation called the burnt pancake problem, the bottom of each pancake in the pile is burnt, and the sort must be completed with the burnt side of every pancake down. It is a signed permutation, and if a pancake i is "burnt side up" a negative element i` is put in place of i in the permutation. The burnt pancake graph is the graph representation of this problem.

For its variant David S. Cohen (David X. Cohen) and Manuel Blum proved in 1995, that  (when the upper limit is only true if ).

The girth of a burnt pancake graph is:

Other classes of pancake graphs
Both in the original pancake sorting problem and the burnt pancake problem, prefix reversal was the operation connecting two permutations. If we allow non-prefixed reversals (as if we were flipping with two spatulas instead of one) then four classes of pancake graphs can be defined. Every pancake graph embeds in all higher-order pancake graphs of the same family.

Applications
Since pancake graphs have many interesting properties such as symmetric and recursive structures (they are Cayley graphs, thus are vertex-transitive), sublogarithmic degree and diameter, and are relatively sparse (compared to e.g. hypercubes), much attention is paid to them as a model of interconnection networks for parallel computers. When we regard the pancake graphs as the model of the interconnection networks, the diameter of the graph is a measure that represents the delay of communication.

Pancake flipping has biological applications as well, in the field of genetic examinations. In one kind of large-scale mutations, a large segment of the genome gets reversed, which is analogous to the burnt pancake problem.

References 

Parametric families of graphs